An annular solar eclipse will occur on Monday, February 5, 2046. A solar eclipse occurs when the Moon passes between Earth and the Sun, thereby totally or partly obscuring the image of the Sun for a viewer on Earth. An annular solar eclipse occurs when the Moon's apparent diameter is smaller than the Sun's, blocking most of the Sun's light and causing the Sun to look like an annulus (ring). An annular eclipse appears as a partial eclipse over a region of the Earth thousands of kilometres wide.

Images 
Animated path

Related eclipses

Solar eclipses of 2044–2047

Saros 141

Inex series

Metonic series

Tritos series

References

External links 

2046 2 5
2046 2 5
2046 2 5